"Everybody's Someone" is the second single taken from American singer LeAnn Rimes' album Whatever We Wanna. The track features vocals from former Westlife singer Brian McFadden. The song also appeared on the Australian version of McFadden's second studio album, Set in Stone, and was released as the album's first single in Australia on January 4, 2007. The song peaked at #28 on the Irish Singles Chart, and at #47 on the UK Singles Chart, as well as peaking at #60 on the ARIA Singles Chart. The Australian version of the single featured extra tracks by McFadden, however, the British single features remixes of Rimes' previous hits. The single was also covered by Sir Cliff Richard and Olivia Newton-John and featured on Richard's album Rise Up

Track listing
 UK CD1
 "Everybody's Someone" (Gateway Mix) – 3:42 (Martin Sutton, Chris Neil)
 "Probably Wouldn't Be This Way" (Dan Huff Remix) – 3:40 (John Kennedy, Tammi Kidd)

 UK CD2
 "Everybody's Someone" (Gateway Mix) – 3:42 (Martin Sutton, Chris Neil)
 "Nothing About Love Makes Sense" – 2:55 (Gary Burr, Joel Fenney, Kylie Sackley)
 "And It Feels Like" (Hi Tack's It Feels Damn Good Remix) – 6:00 (Steve Robson, Thom Shuyler)
 "Everybody's Someone" (Video)

 Australian CD
 "Everybody's Someone" (Gateway Mix) – 3:42 (Martin Sutton, Chris Neil)
 "Auf Wiedersehen Bitch" – 4:08 (Brian McFadden, Guy Chambers)
 "Hole In The Sky" – 3:32 (Brian McFadden, Guy Chambers)
 "Everybody's Someone" (Video)

Chart performance

References

2006 singles
LeAnn Rimes songs
Brian McFadden songs
Country ballads
Pop ballads
Songs written by Martin Sutton
Songs written by Christopher Neil
2006 songs